Kuseh Ahmad (also Romanized as Kūseh Aḩmad) is a village in Nazluchay Rural District, Nazlu District, Urmia County, West Azerbaijan Province, Iran. At the 2006 census, its population was 595, in 100 families.

References 

Populated places in Urmia County